Circleville High School is a public high school in Circleville, Ohio, United States. It is the only high school in the Circleville City School District. Its mascot is the Tiger.

Ohio High School Athletic Association State Championships

 Boys' golf – 1951, 1986 
 Wrestling (Individual) – Nate Keaton 2017, 2018

Notable alumni
 Tony Laubach - professional storm chaser and meteorologist
 Miller Pontius - American football player and investment banker
 Clarence A. Reid - 48th Lieutenant Governor of Michigan
 Jack Sensenbrenner - 46th and 48th Mayor of Columbus
 Robert D. Shadley - U.S. Army major general
 Albert Solliday - Wisconsin State Senator

External links

School website

References

Circleville, Ohio
High schools in Pickaway County, Ohio
Public high schools in Ohio